Pailadzo Captanian, was a survivor of the Armenian genocide and an author. She is also credited with inspiring the creation of Rice-A-Roni which is based on her own recipe of Armenian pilaf.

Life

During the Armenian Genocide in 1915, Pailadzo, while pregnant, was forced to march through the Syrian desert to Aleppo. 

After the Genocide, she wrote her memoirs, which were published in 1919 in French translation, entitled Memoires d'une deportee armenienne. They are considered an important contribution to Armenian Genocide research, since they were penned shortly after the events. The book contributed to Raphael Lemkin's research and his understanding of the Genocide. 

Also in 1919, Mrs. Captanian was reunited with her two other sons whom she had entrusted to a Greek family before the deportations. Afterwards, Pailadzo and her sons moved to the United States, where she worked as a seamstress and sewed draperies for President Franklin D. Roosevelt's home in Hyde Park, New York. In 1922 she published the Armenian original of her memoirs.

After World War II, Pailadzo and her family moved to San Francisco. While in San Francisco, she rented a room to Lois and Tom DeDomenico. Pailadzo taught Lois how to make Armenian pilaf and in 1955 Tom and his brother Vincent, who worked at the Golden Grain Macaroni pasta company founded by their father, came up with the initial recipe for the rice-and-macaroni mixture they called Rice-A-Roni.

Notes

References 
Birth Of Rice-A-Roni: The Armenian-Italian Treat
Captanian, Payladzo A. "Memoires d'une deportee armenienne" (Paris: M. Flinikowski, Editor, 1919)  

American people of Armenian descent
Armenians from the Ottoman Empire
Armenian genocide survivors
Witnesses of the Armenian genocide
Armenian refugees
Syrian emigrants to the United States
Year of birth missing
Year of death missing